The Department of Industry, Science and Technology (also called DIST) was an Australian government department that existed between March 1994 and March 1996.

Scope
Information about the department's functions and/or government funding allocation could be found in the Administrative Arrangements Orders, the annual Portfolio Budget Statements and in the Department's annual reports.

At its creation, the Department was responsible for the following:
Manufacturing and commerce including industries development
Science and technology, including industrial research and development 
Export services
Marketing, including export promotion, of manufactures and services 
Small business
Construction industry (excluding residential construction)
Duties of customs and excise
Bounties on the production of goods
Offsets, to the extent not dealt with by the Department of Defence 
Patents of inventions and designs, and trade marks
Weights and measures
Civil space program
Commission for the Future

Structure
The Department was an Australian Public Service department, staffed by officials who were responsible to the Minister for Industry, Science and Technology, Peter Cook.

References

Ministries established in 1994
Industry, Science and Technology